Tapio Juhani Luoma  (born 15 June 1962) is a Finnish prelate, who has been the Archbishop of Turku and Primate of the Evangelical Lutheran Church of Finland since 1 June 2018.

Biography
Born in Kurikka, Luoma was ordained priest in 1987. He acquired a doctorate in theology in 1999 with his dissertation concerning the relationship between theology and natural sciences. Luoma's dissertation is titled Incarnation and Physics: Natural Science in the Theology of Thomas F. Torrance and is published by Oxford University Press in 2002.

He has worked as a chaplain in Peräseinäjoki between 1987 and 1998, and in Ilmajoki between 1998 and 2002. In 2002 he moved to Seinäjoki as parish priest. He also served as Broadcaster of the Broadcasting Corporation between 1986 and 1987.

On 1 February 2012, he was consecrated as bishop of Espoo by Archbishop Kari Mäkinen and installed as bishop on 12 February in Espoo Cathedral. He was elected as Archbishop of the Evangelical Lutheran Church of Finland on 1 March 2018, and assumed office in June 2018 upon the retirement of Kari Mäkinen.

Luoma is a published author, having authored four books.

Views
Luoma is considered more conservative in his views than his predecessor Archbishop Kari Mäkinen. Luoma opposes church weddings for same-sex couples and holds that marriage is only between a man and a woman. "While Luoma does not support marrying gay couples in the church, he says he will stand behind any decision that the Church makes in the matter."

Honours and awards

Nongovernmental organizations 

  Servare et Manere: Memorial Medal of Tree of Peace (Karlsruhe, Germany, 2022).

References

1962 births
Living people
People from Kurikka
Lutheran archbishops and bishops of Turku
Finnish theologians
21st-century Lutheran archbishops